ACS Applied Energy Materials is a monthly peer-reviewed scientific journal that was established in 2018 by the American Chemical Society. It covers aspects of materials, engineering, chemistry, physics, and biology relevant to sustainable applications in energy conversion and storage. The editor in chief is Kirk S. Schanze. According to the Journal Citation Reports, the journal has a 2021 impact factor of 6.959.

Scope 
ACS Applied Energy Materials publishes letters, articles, reviews, spotlight on application, forum articles, and comments across a given subject area. Specific materials of interest will include, but are not limited to:
Fuel cell
Supercapacitor
Thermoelectrics
Photovoltaics
Photo-electrosynthesis cells

See also
 ACS Applied Materials & Interfaces

References

External links

Applied Energy Materials
Publications established in 2018
Monthly journals
English-language journals
Materials science journals